The Information Centre on Academic Mobility and Equivalence (CIMEA) is the Italian centre in the National Academic Recognition Information Centre (NARIC) network. It was established in 1984 and since 1986 has operated through an agreement with Italy's Ministry of Education, Universities and Research.

References

External links

Organizations established in 1984
Educational testing and assessment organizations
Education in Italy